The 1949–50 Yorkshire Football League was the 24th  season in the history of the Yorkshire Football League. A new Second Division was formed for this season.

Division One

The division featured no new teams (compared to the single division of the season before).

Map

League table

Division Two

The division featured 18 new teams:
Beighton Miners Welfare, joined from Sheffield Association League
Bentley Colliery, joined from Sheffield Association League
Bradford Park Avenue 'A', relegated from Yorkshire League (single division)
Dinnington Athletic, joined from Sheffield Association League
Doncaster Rovers 'A', joined from Sheffield Association League
Farsley Celtic, joined from the West Riding League
Frickley Colliery reserves, joined from ??
Hull City 'A', joined from ??
Kiveton Park Colliery, joined from Sheffield Association League
Maltby Main, joined from Sheffield Association League
Norton Woodseats, joined from Sheffield Association League
Retford Town, joined from Central Alliance
Scarborough reserves, joined from ??
Sheffield, joined from Sheffield Association League
South Kirkby Colliery, relegated from Yorkshire League (single division)
Stocksbridge Works, joined from Sheffield Association League
Worksop Town reserves, joined from Sheffield Association League
York City 'A', joined from ??

Map

League table

League Cup

Semi-final

Final

References

1949–50 in English football leagues
Yorkshire Football League